London Past and Present: Its History, Associations, and Traditions by Henry B. Wheatley is a topographical and historical dictionary of London streets and landmarks, published by John Murray in 1891, that is still regarded as a definitive work in its area. Wheatley's work was based upon The Handbook of London by Peter Cunningham, published 1849, as well as literary, architectural and historical sources.

It was reprinted by Cambridge University Press in 2011 in the Cambridge Library Collection of "works of enduring scholarly value".

Volumes
Vol. I. Preface, Introduction, and Abbey Road to Dyot Street.
Vol. II. Eagle Tavern to Ozinda's Coffee-house.
Vol. III. Paddington to Zoological Gardens, and Index.

See also
The London Encyclopaedia

References

Further reading
Hand-Book of London. Past and Present. Peter Cunningham.
London Past and Present. M.C. Salaman, 1916.
London Town Past and Present Vol. I. W.W. Hutchings.
London Town Past and Present Vol. II. W.W. Hutchings.

1891 non-fiction books
History books about London
Books about London